Bezukhov (meaning lacking ears) is a Russian masculine surname, its feminine counterpart is Bezukhova. Notable people with the surname include:

Pierre Bezukhov, central character in Tolstoy's novel War and Peace

Russian-language surnames